Steve Sanders (September 17, 1952 – June 10, 1998) was an American musician, singer, and songwriter. After playing rhythm guitar in the Oaks Band, Sanders was asked to replace William Lee Golden, the baritone in The Oak Ridge Boys, who had left the group in 1987.

Career
Sanders began singing gospel music at the age of 5. By the age of 6, he was the sole support for his family.  His father played piano, and "Little Stevie" would sing, mostly at church appearances.  Although he lacked formal education — Sanders did not graduate from high school—he was a natural on stage.  
In addition to appearing on Broadway in The Yearling at the age of 12, he was recruited by Otto Preminger in 1967 for the film Hurry Sundown with Faye Dunaway and Jane Fonda.  He also made appearances on Gunsmoke.  The Oak Ridge Boys, who were also a gospel act at the time, used to open for Little Stevie Sanders.  
Upon turning 18, he learned his father had squandered all of his money. Disillusioned and broke, Sanders headed to London, began a band called Pyramid, and was known to jam with the local scene, including Mylon Lefever and 10 Years After.  Years later, upon his return to the United States, Sanders provided vocals for several projects at studios such as Bang Records and Muscle Shoals.
Sanders made his debut with The Oak Ridge Boys band in 1981 as a rhythm guitarist. When William Lee Golden left, he moved to the front and sang baritone with the group from 1987 to 1995.  In that position, Sanders kept the Oak Ridge Boys on the charts by providing the blue-eyed soul on the classics - "Gonna Take Alot of River", "No Matter How High", "Beyond Those Years" and "Bridges and Walls", the last number-one single they had was with Steve Sanders.

Personal life

Born in Richland, Georgia, on September 17, 1952, to Herbert and Lorraine Sanders, he was the oldest of four children (siblings David and Debra, and stepbrother Noah from Herbert's second marriage).  He did not have a typical upbringing.  His father said before his passing, "I heard his voice from downstairs singing with the piano, and thought, there is my retirement plan."

Sanders met his first wife Mary Milbourn at Bang Records; they had two children, Gaylea and Sevren. Twelve years after his divorce from Milbourn, he married Janet Riggins.  The two had met backstage at Bally's in Las Vegas, where the Oak Ridge Boys were performing, and Riggins was a dancer.  They married at the Tennessee Governor's Mansion after an 18-month courtship.

Immediately after Sanders's marriage, his ex-wife began a barrage of harassment and litigation, ultimately draining him financially and causing him to leave the group. Eight hours after Sanders took his life, sheriff's officers showed up with the most recent and final set of papers filed by Milbourn.

Years later, the Oak Ridge Boys were inducted into the Country Music Hall of Fame, though Sanders is not included on the plaque.

Death
Sanders died in 1998 from a self-inflicted gunshot wound to the head.

Discography

Solo
 1966: A Young Boy's Prayer (MGM Records)
 1968: I'm Happy Now (Canaan Records)
 1969: Little Steve Sings Big (Canaan Records)
 1969: This Is My Valley (Canaan Records)
 1970: In The Springtime of his Years (Canaan Records)
 1971: Now (Canaan Records)

With The Oak Ridge Boys
1987: Heartbeat
1988: Monongahela
1989: American Dreams
1989: Greatest Hits 3 (compilation)
1991: Unstoppable
1992: The Long Haul
1995: Country Christmas Eve

Singles he was featured on
1988: "Gonna Take a Lot of River"
1988: "Bridges and Walls"
1988: "Beyond Those Years"
1989: "No Matter How High"
1990: "Lucky Moon"

References

External links

1952 births
1998 suicides
The Oak Ridge Boys members
Suicides by firearm in Florida
American child singers
American male child actors
20th-century American male actors
People from Richland, Georgia
20th-century American singers
20th-century American male musicians
1998 deaths